Paragabara is a genus of moths of the family Erebidae. The genus was erected by George Hampson in 1926.

Species
Paragabara acygonia (Hampson, 1898) India (Himachal Pradesh)
Paragabara biundata Hampson, 1926 Sichuan
Paragabara curvicornuta Kononenko, Han & Matov, 2010 Korea, ...
Paragabara flavomacula (Oberthür, 1880) Korea, Japan, south-east Siberia
Paragabara ochreipennis Sugi, 1962 south-east Siberia, Japan
Paragabara pectinata (Leech, 1900) China

References

Calpinae